Mathania is a genus of butterflies in the family Pieridae. The genus was described by Oberthür in 1890.

The Global Lepidoptera Names Index gives this name as a synonym of Hesperocharis C. Felder, 1862.

Species
Mathania agasicles (Hewitson, 1874)
Mathania aureomaculata (Dognin, 1888)
Mathania carrizoi Giacomelli, 1914
Mathania leucothea (Molina, 1782)

References

Anthocharini
Pieridae genera
Taxa named by Charles Oberthür